The 1951 Kategoria e Dytë is the eighth season of the second tier of football in Albania. The season started in March and ended in August, and 48 teams competed in three stages, with four teams qualifying for the final group, where Dinamo Vlorë won and Puna Shijak finished as runners up.

First round

Group 1

Puna Lezhë won the group and advanced to the next round

Group 2

Puna Rubik won the group and advanced to the next round

Group 3

Puna Shijak won the group and advanced to the next round

Group 4

Spartaku Tiranë won the group and advanced to the next round

Group 5

Puna Lushnjë won the group and advanced to the next round

Group 6

Dinamo Vlorë won the group and advanced to the next round

Group 7

Spartaku Gjirokastër won the group and advanced to the next round

Group 8

Spartaku Korçë won the group and advanced to the next round

Semi-finals

Group 1

Group 2

Final group

Notes

References

Kategoria e Parë seasons
Albania
2